864 Aase is an S-type asteroid belonging to the Flora family in the Main Belt.

The object A917 CB discovered 13 February 1917, by Max Wolf was named 864 Aase, and the object 1926 XB discovered 7 December 1926, by Karl Reinmuth was named 1078 Mentha. In 1958 it was discovered that these were one and the same object. In 1974, this was resolved by keeping the name 1078 Mentha and reusing the name and number 864 Aase for the object 1921 KE, discovered 30 September 1921, by Karl Reinmuth. Aase refers to the character from Henrik Ibsen's play Peer Gynt.

References

External links 
 
 

000864
Discoveries by Karl Wilhelm Reinmuth
Named minor planets
864 Aase
000864
19210930